In mathematics, the free matroid over a given ground-set E is the matroid in which the independent sets are all subsets of E. It is a special case of a uniform matroid. The unique basis of this matroid is the ground-set itself, E. Among matroids on E, the free matroid on E has the most independent sets, the highest rank, and the fewest circuits.

Free extension of a matroid 
The free extension of a matroid  by some element , denoted , is a matroid whose elements are the elements of  plus the new element , and:

 Equivalently, its independent sets are the independent sets of  plus the sets  for all independent sets  that are not bases. 
 Equivalently, its bases are the bases of  plus the sets  for all independent sets of size .

References 

Matroid theory